James Harmon Henderson (born July 29, 1947) is a former American sportscaster based in New Orleans.  He was the radio voice announcer of the New Orleans Saints and also worked as a football analyst for WVUE-DT from 2012 to 2018.  Before that, he worked for WWL-TV from May 8, 1978 to January 31, 2012.

Early life and education
Henderson grew up in Rochester, New York, where he began calling Little League games. After receiving his bachelor's degree in English from the State University of New York at Cortland, he spent some time in the Army. He later earned a Masters in broadcasting from Syracuse University's S. I. Newhouse School of Public Communications.

Career
Henderson began his sports reporting career with the sports director position at Panama City's then NBC affiliate WDTB-TV (now WMBB-TV, an ABC affiliate), then became a sports reporter at the NBC station in Atlanta, WSB-TV.  Henderson joined WWL-TV on May 1, 1978 when he was offered a job as a sportscaster, succeeding the retiring Lloyd "Hap" Glaudi. Henderson with news anchors Garland Robinette and Angela Hill and Chief Meteorologist Nash Roberts helped Channel 4 become the dominant station in New Orleans, a position it holds to this day.

Henderson is a 13-time winner of the National Sportscasters and Sportswriters Association's Sportscaster of the Year Award, an award conferred by sports journalists from all over Louisiana.  Henderson regularly traveled to the Super Bowl, The Masters, and the Major League Baseball All-Star Game because of his work as a reporter for CBS Newspath.

Henderson was the play-by-play announcer on Saints radio broadcasts from 1986 through 2017, formerly teaming with former Saints quarterback Archie Manning. Henderson and Manning broadcast Saints games to listeners (and preseason TV viewers) from 1986 to 1997, with the exception of the 1990 season (when Henderson called regional NFL telecasts on CBS). Henderson went on to team with former Saints running back Hokie Gajan on the radio. Gajan died in 2016 and Deuce McAllister took over as the color analyst.  Henderson was at the microphone for the Saints' first two NFC Championship Game appearances, in 2006 and 2009, as well as their appearance in Super Bowl XLIV.  His reference to that Super Bowl as the "Miracle in Miami" became his most famous call as a broadcaster (see below).

In August 2012, six months after retiring from WWL, Henderson joined rival station WVUE-DT, owned by Saints owner Tom Benson, as an analyst and commentator for the Saints for 6 more years.

Henderson occasionally works with Spencer Tillman on some College Football when Tim Brando is away.

On Feb. 1, 2018, Henderson announced that he has fully retired from broadcasting.

Henderson has residences in both Poplarville, Mississippi, and Mandeville, Louisiana. He is married and has two grown children.

Quotes

References

National Football League announcers
New Orleans Saints announcers
Sportspeople from Rochester, New York
State University of New York at Cortland alumni
S.I. Newhouse School of Public Communications alumni
College basketball announcers in the United States
New Orleans Saints
Living people
1947 births
People from Poplarville, Mississippi
People from Mandeville, Louisiana